Supermodel of the World (Ford Supermodel of the Year, formerly Face of the 80s) is an international modeling contest established by Eileen Ford in 1980. The contest showcases young fashion model entrants from over 50 countries in order to discover new talent for the fashion industry. The winner of the international final event receives a $250,000 modeling contract with Ford Models. The two runners up receive contracts of $150,000 and $100,000 respectively.

Titleholders

 No event was held in 2003.

Notable participants
Notable participants that did not win the contest were Adriana Lima, Chanel Iman, Kendra Spears, Marie-Christine Gessinger, Nadege Herrera, Magdalena Fiolka, Charo Ronquillo, Magdalena Wróbel, Liliane Ferrarezi, Ingrid Schram, Bianca Chiminello, Bipasha Basu, Caron Bernstein, Zana Krasniqi, Paloma Lago, Malin Akerman, Elsa Benítez, Keity Mendieta, Nicole Trunfio, Shiraz Tal, Michelle Behennah, Melanie Marquez, Michelle Robles and Ly Jonaitis

Hosts
1982 – Lee Majors
1990 – Christie Brinkley
1992 – Walt Willey, Ashley Richardson
1993 – Walt Willey, Rachel Hunter
1996 – Richard Steinmetz
2004 – Billy Bush

See also
 Ford Models
 Elite Model Look

References

External links
 Official website
 Official MySpace and Application
 

Recurring events established in 1980
Fashion events in the United States
Modeling competitions